Children of Dust is a 1923 American silent drama film directed by Frank Borzage and starring Johnnie Walker, Pauline Garon, and Lloyd Hughes.

Cast
 Johnnie Walker as Terwilliger 
 Pauline Garon as Helen Raymond 
 Lloyd Hughes as Harvey Livermore 
 Bert Woodruff as Old Archer 
 George Nichols as Terwilliger's Stepfather 
 Mary Carr as Terwilliger's Mother 
 Frankie Lee as Terwilliger - as a child 
 Josephine Adair as Helen Raymond - as a child 
 Newton Hall as Harvey Livermore - as a child

References

Bibliography
 Munden, Kenneth White. The American Film Institute Catalog of Motion Pictures Produced in the United States, Part 1. University of California Press, 1997.

External links

1923 films
1923 drama films
Silent American drama films
Films directed by Frank Borzage
American silent feature films
1920s English-language films
American black-and-white films
First National Pictures films
1920s American films